The Sim (Eśem) is a river in Chelyabinsk Oblast and the Republic of Bashkortostan in Russia. It is a tributary of the Belaya, part of the Volga watershed.

The river has its sources in the southern Ural Mountains. It first flows in a north-northwesterly direction towards the towns of Sim and Minyar, before turning towards the west and then southwest. After passing the town of Asha the Sim crosses the border of Bashkortostan and continues towards the southwest and its confluence with the Belaya.

Ignateva Cave lies on its banks.

References

External links
 Photos of Sim (has English version)

Rivers of Chelyabinsk Oblast
Rivers of Bashkortostan